The Leverian collection was a natural history and ethnographic collection assembled by Ashton Lever. It was noted for the content it acquired from the voyages of Captain James Cook. For three decades it was displayed in London, being broken up by auction in 1806.

The first public location of the collection was the Holophusikon, also known as the Leverian Museum, at Leicester House, on Leicester Square, from 1775 to 1786. After it passed from Lever's ownership, it was displayed for nearly twenty years more at the purpose-built Blackfriars Rotunda just across the Thames, sometimes called Parkinson's Museum for its subsequent owner, James Parkinson (c. 1730-1813).

At Alkrington
Lever collected fossils, shells, and animals (birds, insects, reptiles, fish, monkeys) for many years, accumulating a large collection at his home at Alkrington, near Manchester.  He was swamped with visitors, whom he allowed to view his collection for free, so much so that he had to insist that visitors that arrived on foot would not be admitted. (In other words, only those who could afford a carriage or a riding horse were welcome.) He decided to exhibit the collection in London as a commercial venture, charging an entrance fee.

At Leicester House

Lever acquired a lease of Leicester House in 1774, converting the principal rooms on the first floor into a single large gallery running the length of the house, and opened his museum in February 1775, with around 25,000 exhibits (a small fraction of his collection) valued at over £40,000.  The display included many natural and ethnographic items gathered by Captain James Cook on his voyages. The museum took its name from its supposedly universal coverage of natural history, and was essentially a huge cabinet of curiosities.

Lever charged an entry fee of 5s. 3d., or two guineas for an annual ticket, and the museum had a degree of commercial success; the receipts in 1782 were £2,253.  In an effort to draw in the crowds, Lever later reduced the entrance fee to half a crown (2s. 6d.) and was constantly looking for new exhibits.  He also set out his exhibits to impress the visitor, as well as (unusually) including educational information.  However, he spent more on new exhibits than he raised in entrance fees.

One admirer of the museum was Philip Bury Duncan as a boy: he went on to become keeper of the Ashmolean Museum. Among the objects displayed was the large Viking silver thistle brooch from the Penrith Hoard, discovered by a boy in Cumbria in 1785.  In 1787, a print of it was published, claiming that it was the insignia of the Knights Templar.  It was bought by the British Museum in 1909 (M&ME 1909,6-24,2).

Lottery for the collection
The British Museum and Catherine II of Russia both refused to buy the collection, so Lever obtained an Act of Parliament in 1784 to sell the whole by lottery.  He only sold 8,000 tickets at a guinea each - he had hoped to sell 36,000.

The collection was acquired by James Parkinson, a land agent and accountant.  It continued to be displayed at Leicester House until Lever's death in 1788, at a reduced entrance fee of one shilling.

Move south of the Thames

Parkinson transferred the Leverian collection to a purpose-built Rotunda building, at what would later be No. 3 Blackfriars Road. Leicester House itself was demolished in 1791.

A catalogue and guide was printed in 1790. Parkinson also had George Shaw write an illustrated scientific work; the artists involved included Philip Reinagle, Charles Reuben Ryley, William Skelton, Sarah Stone, and Sydenham Edwards. Some of John White's specimens were put on public display there for the first time. The museum also served as a resource and opportunity for women: Ellenor Fenn wrote A Short History of Insects (1796/7), for which the long title concludes as "a pocket companion to those who visit the Leverian Museum", and a similar volume on quadrupeds; the artist Sarah Stone continued to work for Parkinson, as she had done for Lever.

Parkinson had some success in getting naturalists to attend the museum, which was easier at the time to visit than the British Museum. A visitor in 1799, Heinrich Friedrich Link, was complimentary.

Disposal of the collection
Parkinson also tried to sell the contents at various times. One attempt, a proposed purchase by the government, was wrecked by the adverse opinion of Sir Joseph Banks. In the end, for financial reasons, Parkinson sold the collection in lots by auction in 1806. Among the buyers were Edward Donovan, Edward Stanley, 13th Earl of Derby, and William Bullock; many items went to other museums, including the Imperial Museum of Vienna.

The contents of the museum are well recorded, from a catalogue of the museum created in 1784, and the sale catalogue in 1806, with a contemporary series of watercolours of its contents by Sarah Stone. There are also sale catalogue annotations allowing, for example, the counting of 37 lots bought by Alexander Macleay. The Royal College of Surgeons bought 79 lots, and notes by William Clift survive. Purchases from the sale founded the collection of Richard Cuming. In all 7,879 lots were sold over 65 days.

Surviving specimens and objects

The specimens purchased by Edward Stanley, 13th Earl of Derby were bequeathed to the people of Liverpool upon his death in 1851 and were part of the founding collection of what is now World Museum, National Museums Liverpool.
Stanley bought approximately 117 mounted birds, representing some 96 species, at the auction in 1806. 82 specimens still survived in 1812, 74 in 1823, and at least 29 in 1850. Among the present collections of World Museum are 25 study skins (relaxed mounts) of 22 species recognized as having originated from the Leverian Sale. Nine are recognized as having been collected during the second voyage of James Cook and third voyage of James Cook.

 Black-spotted barbet, adult male, accession no. LIV D1466, Leverian lot no. 1039. The female specimen from the same lot (accession no. LIV D1466c) is lost.
 Barred honeyeater, adult, accession no. LIV D5322, Leverian lot no. 1106. This specimen is the holotype specimen of Certhia fusca Gmelin, 1788 (Syst. Nat. 1, p. 472) and was first described as "Brown Creeper" by Latham, 1782 (Gen. Syn. 1 (2), p. 732). This specimen is also the type of Certhia fasciata Forster, 1844 (Descr. Anim., p. 263). It was collected during the second voyage of James Cook.
 Pacific long-tailed cuckoo, adult, accession no. LIV D3995, Leverian lot no. 1407. This specimen was first described as "Society Cuckow" by Latham, 1782 (Gen. Syn. 1 (2), p. 517).
 European green woodpecker, adult, accession no. LIV D1324f, Leverian lot no. 1418. This specimen is the "white variety".
 Orange-winged amazon, adult, accession no. LIV D682, Leverian lot no. 1514. This specimen was described as "Brasilian Yellow-fronted Parrot var. E" by Latham, 1781 (Gen. Syn. 1 (1), p. 287).
 Crested myna, adult, accession no. LIV D1504, Leverian lot no. 1757.
 Grey-winged trumpeter, adult, accession no. LIV D252, Leverian lot no. 2436.
 South Island kōkako, adult, accession no. LIV D4047, Leverian lot no. 2698. This specimen is a syntype specimen of Glaucopis cinereus Gmelin, 1788 (Syst. Nat. 1, p. 363) and was first described as "Cinereous Wattle-bird" by Latham, 1781 (Gen. Syn. 1 (1), p. 364). It was collected during one of James Cook's voyages from Queen Charlotte Sound / Tōtaranui. This species is critically endangered and possibly extinct.
 Common starling, adult, accession no. LIV D1417b, Leverian lot no. 3142. This specimen is albino and was described as "Var A, White Stare" by Latham, 1783 (Gen. Syn. 2 (1), p. 3).
 Greater ani, adult, accession no. LIV D4027d, Leverian lot no. 4092.
 Magnificent bird-of-paradise, adult, accession no. LIV D88, Leverian lot no. 4751.
 Ancient murrelet, adult, accession no. LIV D3346, Leverian lot no. 5115. This specimen is a syntype specimen of Alca antiqua Gmelin, 1789 (Syst. Nat. 1 (2), p. 554) and was first described as "Ancient Auk" by Latham, 1785 (Gen. Syn. 3 (2), p. 326).
 ʻŌʻū, adult male and female, accession nos. LIV D1829 and LIV D1829a, Leverian lot no. 5488. These specimens are syntype specimens of Loxia psittacea Gmelin, 1789 (Syst. Nat. 1 (2), p. 844) and was first described as "Parrot-billed grosbeak" by Latham, 1783 (Gen. Syn. 2 (1), p. 108).
 Racket-tailed treepie, adult, accession no. LIV D575a, Leverian lot no. 5587.
 Chattering kingfisher, adult, accession no. LIV D2326, Leverian lot no. 5612. This specimen was collected during one of James Cook's voyages, but is of doubtful type significance.
 Purple-throated fruitcrow, adult, accession no. LIV D635, Leverian lot no. 6082. This specimen is a syntype specimen of Muscicapa rubricollis Gmelin, 1789 (Syst. Nat. 1 (2), p. 933) and was first described as "Purple-throated flycatcher" by Latham, 1785 (Gen. Syn. 2 (1), p. 365).
 Stone partridge, adult, accession no. LIV D1495b, Leverian lot no. 6083.
 Guinea turaco, adult, accession no. LIV D97a, Leverian lot no. 27 (last day but two).
 Ruddy shelduck, adult, accession no. LIV D849, Leverian lot no. 34 (last day but two).
 Tui (bird), adult male and female, accession nos. LIV D1698a and LIV D1698g, Leverian lot no. 44 (last day but one). These specimens are syntype specimens of Merops novaeseelandiae Gmelin, 1788 (Syst. Nat. 1, p. 464) and was first described as "Poe bee-eater" by Latham, 1782 (Gen. Syn. 1 (2), p. 682). These specimens were collected during the second voyage of James Cook from Queen Charlotte Sound / Tōtaranui.
 Large-billed seed finch, adult, accession no. LIV D2005a, Leverian lot no. 47 (last day but one). 1106. This specimen is the holotype specimen of Loxia regulus Shaw, 1792 (Mus. Lev., p. 45), a forgery perpetrated by adding a false crest of red feathers to a large-billed seed finch specimen.
 African swamphen, adult, accession no. LIV D1824, Leverian lot no. 23 (last day of the sale).
 Several hundred specimens (the exact number being unknown) of birds are in the collection of the Natural History Museum, Vienna. This includes a specimen (number NMW 50.761) of the extinct Lord Howe Swamphen.

A number of ethnographic objects survive in the collections of the British Museum.

References

Entertainment in London
Former buildings and structures in the City of Westminster
1775 establishments in England
1806 disestablishments in the United Kingdom
Defunct museums in London
Private collections in the United Kingdom
Natural history museums in England